Peyrabout is a commune in the Creuse department in the Nouvelle-Aquitaine region in central France.

Geography

Population

Sights
 The church of St. Madeleine, dating from the twelfth century.

See also
Communes of the Creuse department

References

Communes of Creuse